The 2008 WGC-Bridgestone Invitational was a golf tournament that was contested from July 31 – August 3, 2008 over the South Course at Firestone Country Club in Akron, Ohio. It was the tenth WGC-Bridgestone Invitational tournament, and the third of three World Golf Championships events held in 2008.

Vijay Singh won the tournament, and claimed his first World Golf Championships title. He shot a 10-under par 270 to win over Stuart Appleby and Lee Westwood by one stroke.

Field
1. Playing members of the 2007 United States and International Presidents Cup teams
Stuart Appleby (3,4), Woody Austin (3,4), Ángel Cabrera (3,4,5), K. J. Choi (3,4,5), Stewart Cink (2,3,4,5), Ernie Els (3,4,5), Jim Furyk (2,3,4), Lucas Glover, Retief Goosen (3,4), Charles Howell III, Trevor Immelman (3,4), Zach Johnson (2,3,4), Hunter Mahan (3,4), Phil Mickelson (2,3,4,5), Geoff Ogilvy (3,4,5), Nick O'Hern, Rory Sabbatini (3,4), Adam Scott (3,4,5), Vijay Singh (3,4), Steve Stricker (3,4,5), David Toms (2), Scott Verplank (2,3,4)
Mike Weir (3,4,5) and Tiger Woods (2,3,4,5) did not play.

2. Playing members of the 2006 United States and European Ryder Cup teams
Chad Campbell, Paul Casey (3,4), Darren Clarke (5), Chris DiMarco, Sergio García (3,4,5), Pádraig Harrington (3,4,5), J. J. Henry, David Howell, Robert Karlsson (3,4), Paul McGinley, Colin Montgomerie, Henrik Stenson (3,4), Vaughn Taylor, Lee Westwood (3,4,5)
Luke Donald (3,4), José María Olazábal, and Brett Wetterich did not play.

3. Top 50 players from the Official World Golf Rankings two weeks prior to event
Robert Allenby (4), Stephen Ames (4,5), Aaron Baddeley (4), Tim Clark (4), Niclas Fasth (4), Richard Green (4), Søren Hansen (4,5), Trevor Immelman (4,5), Freddie Jacobson (4), Miguel Ángel Jiménez (4,5), Martin Kaymer (4,5), Anthony Kim (4,5), Justin Leonard (4,5), Graeme McDowell (4,5), Rocco Mediate (4), Sean O'Hair (4,5), Rod Pampling (4), Kenny Perry (4,5), Ian Poulter (4,5), Andrés Romero (4,5), Justin Rose (4,5), Brandt Snedeker (4), Boo Weekley (4,5), Oliver Wilson (4)

4. Top 50 players from the Official World Golf Rankings one week prior to event

5. Tournament winners of worldwide events since the prior year's tournament with an Official World Golf Ranking Strength of Field Rating of 115 points or more
Mark Brown, Daniel Chopra, Nick Dougherty, Richard Finch, Ross Fisher, Steve Flesch, J. B. Holmes, Brendan Jones, James Kingston, Pablo Larrazábal, Peter Lonard, Steve Lowery, Craig Parry, Chez Reavie, Brett Rumford, Scott Strange, D. J. Trahan, Johnson Wagner, Steve Webster

6. The winner of selected tournaments from each of the following tours:
Japan Golf Tour: Japan Golf Tour Championship (2008) – Hidemasa Hoshino
PGA Tour of Australasia: Australian PGA Championship (2007) – Peter Lonard, qualified in category 5
Sunshine Tour: Vodacom Championship (2008) – James Kingston, qualified in category 5
Asian Tour: Volvo Masters of Asia (2007) – Prayad Marksaeng

Past champions in the field

Round summaries

First round

Second round

Third round

Final round

Scorecard

Cumulative tournament scores, relative to par

Source:

References

External links
Full results

WGC Invitational
WGC-Bridgestone Invitational
WGC-Bridgestone Invitational
WGC-Bridgestone Invitational
WGC-Bridgestone Invitational